The 2020 Saskatchewan general election was held on October 26, 2020 to elect members of the Legislative Assembly of Saskatchewan. This date is set by Saskatchewan's fixed election date law. The writ was dropped on September 29 just in time to hold the election on October 26.

The previous election re-elected the Saskatchewan Party to its third consecutive majority government under the leadership of Brad Wall. On August 10, 2017, Wall announced his resignation as leader, pending the election of his successor. On January 27, 2018, Environment Minister Scott Moe was elected leader of the Saskatchewan Party. He was appointed and sworn in as premier on February 2.

The conservative Saskatchewan Party under Moe was re-elected to its fourth consecutive majority government.

There had been discussion of holding a referendum on electoral change (moving to proportional representation) but no such referendum was held in conjunction with this election.

Date
Since 2010, the Legislative Assembly has had a fixed four-year term.
of this subsection must be held on Monday, October 26, 2020". However, the act also provides that if the election period would overlap with a federal election period, the provincial election is to be postponed until the first Monday of the following April; in this case: April 5, 2021. Because the incumbent 43rd Canadian Parliament is a minority Parliament, such a federal election was possible, but it did not occur prior to the provincial election being called. The fixed election law does not infringe on the Lieutenant Governor's right to dissolve the Legislative Assembly at an earlier date on the Premier's advice.

Although Premier Moe hinted at the possibility of a snap election in the Spring of 2020, Moe announced on March 12 that he would not do so, citing the ongoing COVID-19 pandemic in Saskatchewan.

This is the third provincial election held in Canada during the COVID-19 pandemic in Canada after New Brunswick and British Columbia.

Incumbents not contesting their seats

Retiring incumbents
Saskatchewan Party
New Democratic Party

Election summary
Like the previous election, few seats changed hands, though there was a small swing in the overall popular vote to the NDP. The Saskatchewan Party retained its sweep of the central and southern rural ridings, with no rural seats changing hands. Overall, the NDP's seat total was left unchanged at 13. No other party won any seats.

Saskatoon saw a swing to the NDP, with the New Democrats recording a net gain of one seat. The NDP picked up Saskatoon Eastview and Saskatoon University from the Sask. Party, however (especially given the overall swing to the NDP in the cities) the surprise of the night was in Saskatoon Riversdale, the riding of former premier Roy Romanow, which was won by the Saskatchewan Party for the first time ever. It was only the second time in that riding's history it was not won by the NDP, and arguably an even bigger upset since the only other such occasion was the 1982 Progressive Conservative landslide in which (unlike in 2020) the Tories took all of Saskatoon.

Regina also saw a swing towards the NDP, which gained Regina University from the Saskatchewan Party. However, this was balanced by the loss of its 2018 by-election gain of Regina Northeast. The Saskatchewan Party also re-gained the seat of Prince Albert Northcote, leaving the NDP shut out outside of Saskatoon, Regina and Northern Saskatchewan.

The newly formed Buffalo Party finished second in four rural ridings, and finished third place in the overall popular vote despite running far fewer candidates than the Green Party or the Progressive Conservatives. The PC's finished fifth behind the Greens in overall popular vote, but recorded more votes per candidate than the Greens. The Greens were the only other party besides the Saskatchewan Party and NDP to run anything close to a full slate of candidates, but averaged barely more votes per candidate on average than the essentially dormant Liberal Party. The Liberals ran only three paper candidates in order to maintain their party registration and did not run a meaningful campaign.

|-
!rowspan="2" colspan="2"|Party
!rowspan="2"|Leader
!rowspan="2"|Candidates
!colspan="4"|Seats
!colspan="3"|Popular vote
|-
!2016
!Dissol.
!2020
!+/-
!Votes
!%
!% change

|align=left|Scott Moe
|61 ||51 ||46 || 48 || -3 || 269,996 || 61.12 || –1.41

|align=left|Ryan Meili
|61 ||10|||13|| 13 || +3 || 140,584 || 31.82 || +1.54

|align=left|Wade Sira (i)
| 17 || 0 || 0 || 0 || ±0 || 11,298 || 2.56 || New

|align=left|Naomi Hunter
| 60 ||0 ||0 || 0 || ±0 || 10,033 || 2.27 || +0.43

|align=left|Ken Grey
| 31 || 0 || 0 || 0 || ±0 || 8,404 || 1.90 || +0.62

|align=left|Robert Rudachyk (i)
| 3 || 0 || 0 || 0 || ±0 || 355 || 0.08 || –3.51

| colspan="2" style="text-align:left;"|Independent
| 3 || 0 || 0 || 0 || ±0 || 1,076 || 0.24 || –0.15

| colspan="4" style="text-align:left;"|Vacant
| 2 || colspan="5" 
|-
|align=left colspan="8"|Blank and invalid votes || 3,265 || 0.73
|-
| style="text-align:left;" colspan="3"|Total
|236 ||61 ||61 || 61 || 0 || 445,011 ||100.00 || 0
|-
|align=left colspan="8"|Eligible voters / turnout || 841,807 || 52.86
|}

Historical results from 1991 onwards

Synopsis of results

 = open seat
 = turnout is above provincial average
 = incumbency arose from byelection gain
 = incumbent re-elected in same riding
 = NDP candidate - nomination reversed by party leader
 = other incumbent renominated

Seats changing hands
Seven seats changed allegiance from 2016:

 Sask to NDP

 Regina University
 Saskatoon Eastview
 Saskatoon Fairview
 Saskatoon Meewasin
 Saskatoon University

 NDP to Sask

 Prince Albert Northcote
 Saskatoon Riversdale

Detailed analysis

5 closest ridings
Incumbents are denoted in bold and followed by (I).

Candidates by riding
Candidates in bold represent cabinet members and the Speaker of the Legislative Assembly. Party leaders are italicized''. The symbol † indicates incumbent MLAs who are not running again.

Northwest Saskatchewan

Northeast Saskatchewan

West Central Saskatchewan

Southwest Saskatchewan

Southeast Saskatchewan

Saskatoon

Regina

List of MLAs who lost their seat

Open seats changing hands

Opinion polls

References

2020
Saskatchewan 29th
2020 in Saskatchewan